The Journal of Film and Video is the official academic journal of the University Film and Video Association. It features articles on film and video production, history, theory, criticism, and aesthetics. The journal is published by the University of Illinois Press for the association and the current editor is Michael Clark,  of California State University, Los Angeles.

See also
 List of film periodicals

References

External links
 Journal of Film and Video

Film studies journals
Media studies journals
Television studies journals
University of Illinois Press academic journals